Knock (French title: Knock ou le Triomphe de la médecine) is a 1923 French satirical play about modern medicine, written by Jules Romains. It was performed for the first time at the Théâtre des Champs-Élysées in Paris on 15 December 1923 in a production by Louis Jouvet. The play was presented with set designs by a young Orson Welles in Dublin in 1932, translated into and performed in Esperanto the same year, and also broadcast on TV by BBC Television as early as 1938.

Plot
The ambitious Dr. Knock arrives in a rural village, Saint-Maurice, to step into Dr. Parpalaid's footsteps as the local physician. Unfortunately, most of the villagers are in good health. He therefore decides to make everybody believe they are actually far sicker then they actually are...

The magazine Esperanto summarized the play in 1932 as being about an old fashioned doctor and a very modern doctor, both tricking each other, with the modern doctor Knock winning.

Adaptations

Theatrical adaptations
Titled Dr. Knock, the play was presented at the Peacock Theatre in Dublin in 1932, with set designs by the 16-year-old Orson Welles.

The play was translated into Esperanto by Pierre Corret. The translation, with the title Knock, aŭ La Triumfo de Medicino was published in 1932, and the same year the play was performed at the 24th World Esperanto Congress in Paris. The translation was described as "completely classical, orthodox" by the magazine Esperanto.

Film adaptations
 , directed by René Hervil (1925), starring Fernand Fabre
 , directed by Roger Goupillières and Louis Jouvet (1933), starring Louis Jouvet
 Dr. Knock, directed by Guy Lefranc (1951), starring Louis Jouvet
 Knock, directed by Lorraine Lévy (2017), starring Omar Sy

TV adaptations
A version entitled "Doctor Knock" was broadcast on BBC Television from Alexandra Palace - the only television of the time - on 13 January 1938. Performed live, no recording is thought to have ever existed.

A British television version for the BBC's Theatre 625 series was broadcast in 1966. This version was telerecorded and has survived.

References

External links

1923 plays
Comedy plays
Satirical plays
Diseases and disorders in theatre
French plays adapted into films
Plays adapted into television shows
Plays set in France
Hypochondriasis in fiction
Fictional physicians
Fictional French people